Felix Richard (28 May 1900 – 23 April 1968) was a French racing cyclist. He rode in the 1923 Tour de France.

References

1900 births
1968 deaths
French male cyclists
Place of birth missing